Rhodanobacter rhizosphaerae is a Gram-negative, aerobic, non-spore-forming and non-motile bacterium from the genus of Rhodanobacter which has been isolated from rhizospheric soil of a ginseng plant from Geumsan in Korea.

References

External links
Type strain of Rhodanobacter rhizosphaerae at BacDive -  the Bacterial Diversity Metadatabase

Xanthomonadales
Bacteria described in 2017